Bakdash, alternatively romanised as Bakdach, is a landmark ice cream parlor in the Al-Hamidiyah Souq in the ancient city of Damascus. Established in 1895, it is famous for its traditional Middle Eastern booza—a mastic frozen dairy dessert. It is noted around the Arab world and has become a popular tourist attraction.

A second branch opened in Amman, Jordan in 2013 to cater to a growing Syrian diaspora there—amidst the Syrian civil war, slowing economic activity, and supply chain problems at the main Damascene branch.

See also
 Dondurma

References

Bibliography
 

Mastic ice creams
Restaurants in Damascus
Ice cream parlors
1895 establishments in the Ottoman Empire
Restaurants established in 1895
Buildings and structures inside the walled city of Damascus